The 2013 European Masters were held from April 17 to 20 at the Sports Center Lerchenfeld in St. Gallen, Switzerland as part of the 2012–13 World Curling Tour. It was the final event on the Curling Champions Tour (CCT) of Europe, and featured the top teams from the CCT rankings.

Teams
The teams for the European Masters were invited based on their top-ten finishes in the Curling Champions Tour ranking list for the 2012–13 season, with the exception of Mark Dacey's Canadian team, who were a special invite. The top-ranked teams skipped by Niklas Edin and Thomas Ulsrud declined their invitations due to their participation in the 2013 Players' Championship, which ran at the same time as the European Masters.

The teams are listed as follows:

Round-robin standings
Final round-robin standings

Round-robin results
All draw times are listed in Central European Summer Time (UTC+2).

Draw 1
Wednesday, April 17, 15:00

Draw 2
Thursday, April 18, 13:00

Draw 3
Thursday, April 18, 20:00

Playoffs

Semifinals
Friday, April 19, 13:00

Bronze medal game
Saturday, April 20, 19:30

Final
Saturday, April 20, 19:30

Ranking games

Semifinals
Friday, April 19, 13:00

Fifth place game
Saturday, April 20, 19:30

Seventh place game
Saturday, April 20, 19:30

References

External links

Results

2013
2013 in Swiss sport
2013 in curling
Sport in St. Gallen (city)
April 2013 sports events in Europe
Curling competitions in Switzerland